Swaffham railway station was located in Swaffham, Norfolk.  It was the junction for lines to King's Lynn, Dereham, and Thetford.  The Thetford branch closed on 15 June 1964, and the station closed to passengers on 9 September 1968.

References

Further reading
 – gives a description of operations at this station in 1953

External links 
 Swaffham station on 1946 O. S. map

Former Great Eastern Railway stations
Railway stations in Great Britain opened in 1847
Railway stations in Great Britain closed in 1968
Disused railway stations in Norfolk
Swaffham
1847 establishments in England
1968 disestablishments in England